Ned Dixon "Dickie" Hemric (August 29, 1933 – August 3, 2017) was an American collegiate and professional basketball player for Wake Forest University (1952–1955) and the NBA's Boston Celtics (1955–1957).

Hemric played the first two college years at Wake Forest when the school was a member of the Southern Conference. The Atlantic Coast Conference (ACC) Male Athlete of the Year was created at the start of the 1954 season, and he played his last two seasons in the ACC, setting conference records for scoring and rebounding that were untouched for the first 50 years of the conference's existence. He was honored as the second recipient of the ACC Athlete of the Year in 1955.  In 2002 Hemric was selected to the ACC 50th Anniversary men's basketball team, honoring the 50 greatest players in ACC history.

Hemric's ACC scoring record of 2,587 points was untouched from 1956 until it was finally broken in 2006 by Duke University's JJ Redick and in 2009 by Tyler Hansbrough of the University of North Carolina. Hemric held the NCAA record for free throws made in a career with 905 for 54 years until it was passed by Hansbrough. Hemric still holds the Division I record for most free throw attempts (1,359) in a career.

Hemric's ACC record of 1,802 career rebounds may never face a serious challenge - for four decades the nearest runner-up was his contemporary Ronnie Shavlik who is now third on the list with 1,567 rebounds from 1954 to 1956. Second is legendary NBA power forward Tim Duncan, who pulled down 1,570 rebounds at Wake Forest from 1994 to 1997. With most of today's elite ACC players leaving for the NBA before completing four seasons, it is difficult to project a scenario in which Hemric's record could ever be broken. Nationally Hemric is still fifth all-time in Division I career rebounds.

Hemric died on August 3, 2017 at his home in North Canton, Ohio nearly four weeks shy of his 84th birthday.

See also
 List of NCAA Division I men's basketball career free throw scoring leaders
 List of NCAA Division I men's basketball career rebounding leaders
 List of NCAA Division I men's basketball players with 2000 points and 1000 rebounds

References

1933 births
2017 deaths
All-American college men's basketball players
American men's basketball players
Basketball players from North Carolina
Boston Celtics draft picks
Boston Celtics players
People from Jonesville, North Carolina
People from North Canton, Ohio
Power forwards (basketball)
Wake Forest Demon Deacons men's basketball players